Lenton may refer to:

People
Lenton (surname)
Lenton Parr (1924–2003), Australian sculptor

Places
 Lenton, Lincolnshire, sometimes known as Lavington
 Lenton, Nottingham, a district of the city of Nottingham, including:
 Lenton Abbey, an administrative district
 Lenton Hall, country house now used for student accommodation at Nottingham University
 Lenton Priory, the remains of a medieval religious establishment
 Lenton and Wortley Hall, undergraduate hall of residence at Nottingham University
 Lenton railway station, built by the Midland Railway company and closed in 1911
 Lenton Bluff, a rock bluff (cliff) at the mouth of Jeffries Glacier in the Theron Mountains
 Lenton Point, a headland in the South Orkney Islands

See also
Allenton (disambiguation)
Ellenton (disambiguation)
Lento (disambiguation)